Grzybowo  is a settlement in the administrative district of Gmina Reszel, within Kętrzyn County, Warmian-Masurian Voivodeship, in northern Poland. 

The settlement has a population of 2. The settlement is within a Forest Reserve, the Grzybowo Forest.

References

Villages in Kętrzyn County